Bird's eye view may refer to:

 Bird's-eye view, a view of an object from above, as though the observer were a bird, often used in the making of blueprints, floor plans and maps 
 Bing Maps#Bird's eye view, the angled photographic views from Microsoft
 Birds Eye View, a platform for emerging women filmmakers founded by Rachel Millward and Pinny Grylls in 2002
 Bird's Eye View (album), an album from singer/songwriter Amy Kuney, released in 2008
 Bird's Eye View, a BBC television series of 1969-1971

Songs
 "Bird's Eye View", by Xzibit from his 1996 debut album At the Speed of Life
 "Bird's Eye View", by Brendan Benson from his 1996 album One Mississippi
 "Bird's Eye View", by Quasi from their 1997 album R&B Transmogrification
 "Bird's Eye View", by Zion I from their 2005 album True & Livin'

See also
 From a Bird's Eye View, 1970-1 British sitcom